The 37th National Film Awards, presented by Directorate of Film Festivals, the organisation set up by Ministry of Information and Broadcasting, India to felicitate the best of Indian Cinema released in the year 1989. Ceremony took place in May 1990 and awards were given by then President of India, R. Venkataraman.

Starting with 37th National Film Awards, new award in feature films section was introduced for Environment Conservation/Preservation as National Film Award for Best Film on Environment Conservation/Preservation and awarded with Rajat Kamal (Silver Lotus) for producer and director of the film. Another new award was introduced for National Film Award for Best First Non-Feature Film of a Director, but not given for 37th National Film Awards.

Also, National Film Award for Best Book on Cinema has been promoted to Swarna Kamal (Golden Lotus) Award.

Awards 

Awards were divided into feature films, non-feature films and books written on Indian cinema.

Lifetime Achievement Award

Feature films 

Feature films were awarded at All India as well as regional level. For 37th National Film Awards, a Bengali film, Bagh Bahadur won the National Film Award for Best Feature Film whereas two Malayalam films, Mathilukal and Oru Vadakkan Veeragatha won the maximum number of awards (4). Following were the awards given in each category:

Juries 

A committee headed by Atma Ram was appointed to evaluate the feature films awards. Following were the jury members:

 Jury Members
 Atma Ram (Chairperson)Basu BhattacharyaIqbal MasoodK. G. GeorgeSitakant MisraMahendranA. PundarikakshayyaKundan ShahAribam Syam SharmaDilip Kumar HazarikaBhim SenR. LakshmanValampuri SomanathanSaikat BhattacharyaSreekumaran ThampiD. V. Narasa Raju

All India Award 

Following were the awards given:

Golden Lotus Award 

Official Name: Swarna Kamal

All the awardees are awarded with 'Golden Lotus Award (Swarna Kamal)', a certificate and cash prize.

Silver Lotus Award 

Official Name: Rajat Kamal

All the awardees are awarded with 'Silver Lotus Award (Rajat Kamal)', a certificate and cash prize.

Regional Awards 

The award is given to best film in the regional languages in India.

Non-Feature Films 

Short Films made in any Indian language and certified by the Central Board of Film Certification as a documentary/newsreel/fiction are eligible for non-feature film section.

Juries 

A committee headed by Jagat Murari was appointed to evaluate the non-feature films awards. Following were the jury members:

 Jury Members
 Jagat Murari (Chairperson)Tapan K. BoseSantosh SivanGhanashyam MahapatraParesh Mehta

Golden Lotus Award 

Official Name: Swarna Kamal

All the awardees are awarded with 'Golden Lotus Award (Swarna Kamal)', a certificate and cash prize.

Silver Lotus Award 

Official Name: Rajat Kamal

All the awardees are awarded with 'Silver Lotus Award (Rajat Kamal)' and cash prize.

Best Writing on Cinema 

The awards aim at encouraging study and appreciation of cinema as an art form and dissemination of information and critical appreciation of this art-form through publication of books, articles, reviews etc.

Juries 

A committee headed by Mrinal Pande was appointed to evaluate the writing on Indian cinema. Following were the jury members:

 Jury Members
 Mrinal Pande (Chairperson)Firooze RangoonwalaC. Radhakrishnan

Golden Lotus Award 
Official Name: Swarna Kamal

All the awardees are awarded with 'Golden Lotus Award (Swarna Kamal)' and cash prize.

Silver Lotus Award 
Official Name: Rajat Kamal

All the awardees are awarded with 'Silver Lotus Award (Rajat Kamal)' and cash prize.

Awards not given 

Following were the awards not given as no film was found to be suitable for the award:

 Best Feature Film in Assamese
 Best Feature Film in English
 Best Feature Film in Manipuri
 Best First Non-Feature Film
 National Film Award for Best Non-Feature Film Direction
 Best Exploration / Adventure Film

References

External links 
 National Film Awards Archives
 Official Page for Directorate of Film Festivals, India

National Film Awards (India) ceremonies
1990 Indian film awards